is a motorsports facility in the town of Murata, Shibata District, Miyagi Prefecture, Japan. It opened in 1975 and is one of the largest motorsports facilities in Japan, with a total area of 2.1 million m². It offers four specialized race courses - a road racing course, a motocross course, a trials course, and a go-kart course.

Events

Annual racing events at the facility include
 Super GT
 Super Formula
 MFJ Superbikes All Japan Road Race Championship
 Super Taikyu

The facility also used to host a Superbike World Championship round from  until , and a D1 Grand Prix event.

 Current

 May: MFJ Superbikes All Japan Road Race Championship
 June: Asia Road Racing Championship, Super Formula Championship, Super Formula Lights
 July: Super Taikyu
 August: Ferrari Challenge Japan
 September: Super GT, F4 Japanese Championship
 October: Formula Regional Japanese Championship Sugo Champion Cup Race Series
 November: TCR Japan Touring Car Series

 Former

 All-Japan Sports Prototype Championship (1990–1992)
 Fuji Grand Champion Series (1988–1989)
 GT World Challenge Asia (2022)
 Japan Le Mans Challenge (2006–2007)
 Japanese Touring Car Championship (1985–1998)
 Motocross World Championship (2005)
 Superbike World Championship (1988–2003)

Course

Lap records

The official race lap records at the Sportsland Sugo are listed as:

Access
 Tohoku Expressway
About 10 minutes from Murata IC
It takes about 20 minutes from Sendai Minami IC via Miyagi Prefectural Road No. 31 Sendai Murata Line.

References

External links 
 Sportsland SUGO Official Website Japanese

Motorsport venues in Japan
Superbike World Championship circuits
Sports venues in Miyagi Prefecture
Murata, Miyagi
Sports venues completed in 1975
1975 establishments in Japan